Jose Antonio (born 31 July 1990) is an Angolan basketball player. He plays for Petro de Luanda of the Angolan Basketball League.

Professional career
Jose Antonio plays for the Atlético Petróleos de Luanda. He participated in the 2018–19 Africa Basketball League where he averaged 5.5 points, 2.8 rebounds and 1 assists per game.

National team career
Jose Antonio represented the Angola national basketball team at the 2019 FIBA Basketball World Cup in China, where he averaged 5.4 points, 1.4 rebound and 0.6 assists per game.

References

1990 births
Living people
Atlético Petróleos de Luanda basketball players
Small forwards
2019 FIBA Basketball World Cup players
Angolan men's basketball players